Maryna Vergelyuk (born 24 June 1978 in Kherson) is a Ukrainian team handball player. She received a bronze medal with the Ukrainian national team at the 2004 Summer Olympics in Athens.

References

External links

1978 births
Living people
Sportspeople from Kherson
Ukrainian female handball players
Handball players at the 2004 Summer Olympics
Olympic bronze medalists for Ukraine
Olympic medalists in handball
Medalists at the 2004 Summer Olympics